The Sheik Steps Out is a 1937 American musical film directed by Irving Pichel and written by Adele Buffington and Gordon Kahn. The film stars Ramon Novarro, Lola Lane, Gene Lockhart, Kathleen Burke, Stanley Fields and Billy Bevan. The film was released on September 6, 1937, by Republic Pictures.

Plot

Cast  
Ramon Novarro as Ahmed Ben Nesib
Lola Lane as Phyllis 'Flip' Murdock
Gene Lockhart as Samuel P. Murdock
Kathleen Burke as Gloria Parker
Stanley Fields as Abu Saal
Billy Bevan as Munson
Charlotte Treadway as Polly Parker
Robert Coote as Lord Eustace Byington
Leonid Kinskey as Allusi Ali
Georges Renavent as Count Mario
Jamiel Hasson as Kisub
C. Montague Shaw as Dr. Peabody - Minister
George Sorel as Lt. Bordeaux

References

External links
 

1937 films
American musical films
1937 musical films
Republic Pictures films
Films directed by Irving Pichel
American black-and-white films
1930s English-language films
1930s American films